Molecular Ecology Resources is a monthly scientific journal covering development of tools and techniques to address questions in ecology, evolution, behavior, and conservation. It is the companion journal of Molecular Ecology and is published by Wiley-Blackwell. From 2001–2007, it was published under the name Molecular Ecology Notes. Its 2017 impact factor is 7.059.

References

Ecology journals
English-language journals
Wiley-Blackwell academic journals
Monthly journals
Publications established in 2001